Three ships of the Royal Navy have borne the name HMS Jumna, after another name for the Yamuna River in India. A ship of the Royal Indian Navy has been named HMIS Jumna:

 was an iron paddle vessel launched in 1832. Her fate is unknown.
 was a 16-gun brig-sloop built as HMS Zebra but renamed in 1846 and launched in 1848. She was sold in 1862.
 was an iron screw troopship launched in 1866. She became a coal hulk in 1893 and took the name C110. She was sold in 1922 as the hulk Oceanic.
 was a modified  sloop launched in 1940. She was later commissioned into the Indian Navy as INS Jamuna and became a survey ship in 1957 before being paid off and broken up in 1980.

Royal Navy ship names